Tumby Bay  is a coastal town situated on the Spencer Gulf, on the eastern coast of Eyre Peninsula in South Australia,  north of Port Lincoln. The town of Tumby Bay is the major population centre of the District Council of Tumby Bay, and the centre of an agricultural district farming cereal crops and sheep, as well as having established fishing and tourism industries.

History
The bay was first explored and given the name Tumby Bay by Matthew Flinders in 1802, after a parish in Lincolnshire, England. In 1840 Governor Gawler renamed the bay  Harvey('s) Bay after one other district's early settlers. Then on 15 November 1900 the town of Tumby was proclaimed by Governor Tennyson, and the name of the bay itself reverted to Tumby Bay. On 14 June 1984 the town officially became known as Tumby Bay.

The earliest settlers to the district arrived in the 1840s, and farmed the area with wheat and sheep predominantly. The town soon grew into an important grain storage and loading point, with a jetty constructed in 1874, only the second to be built on the Eyre Peninsula. This provided a much needed outlet for the copper ore which was coming from the Burrowing Mine. The original jetty was taken down in 1999 due to safety concerns, but the other newer jetty is still in use.

The town's first school was opened in 1881 as 'Tumby', and the district's first hospital opened in 1913.

Tumby Bay hosted the popular event Triple J's One Night Stand on 2 April 2011, featuring the bands Birds of Tokyo, Art vs. Science and The Jezabels and locally "Unearthed" musician Joshy Willo. The town's population swelled from 1,000 to over 12,000 for the event.

The historic Tumby Bay Hotel in North Terrace is listed on the South Australian Heritage Register.

Geography
Tumby Bay lies on the large, sheltered bay of the same name on the western side of Spencer Gulf. Much of the land surrounding Tumby Bay is used for agriculture. The coast is predominantly white, sandy beaches, on which the town itself is situated, as well as towering cliffs to the south.

Inside the bay, Tumby Island is the only island but further offshore lie the Sir Joseph Banks Group, a small archipelago that is easily accessed by boat from Tumby Bay.

Like much of coastal South Australia, Tumby Bay experiences a Mediterranean climate with warm to hot summers and moderately wet winters.

Economy
Since it was first settled, Tumby Bay has predominantly been an agriculturally driven town, with cereal crops, sheep and beef commonly farmed. As with many towns on the Eyre Peninsula, Tumby Bay also has a well-established professional fishing industry.

Tourism 
Tumby Bay is a popular holiday destination during the summer months. One of the major drawcards to the area is its fishing, with a wide array of fish species available, including King George Whiting and Snapper. Fishing can be enjoyed from the town jetty, the surrounding beach and rock areas, as well as from a boat, which allows access to the Sir Joseph Banks Group. In 2001, a marina was constructed to allow easy all weather boat launching for a range of boat sizes, as well as opening up new real estate options.

The safe, calm waters and the white sand of the bay lend themselves to a variety of watersports including swimming, snorkelling, scuba diving and water skiing for those with access to a boat. The town has a caravan park and a number of hotels and apartments offering tourist accommodation. The township affords easy access to a variety of facilities and shops.

Scuba diving 

The ecological communities on and around the pylons supporting the Tumby Bay jetty make for an interesting and easy shore dive. Visiting divers must bring their own equipment, as no dive shop exists in the town. Alternatively, equipment can be hired from dive shops in Port Lincoln (45 km south-west) or Whyalla (221 km north-east).

Community

Tumby Bay had a town population of 1228 in the 2001 census, with the vast majority being Australian born. Of those that immigrated (about 100 people), most are from the United Kingdom, with others coming from a variety of European countries, the United States and New Zealand.

The 2001 census by the Australian Bureau of Statistics found that the main religion followed in Tumby Bay was Christianity, with the Anglican, Catholic, and Uniting denominations having the strongest followings. The overall religious affiliations are summed up in the chart, derived from the census data.

There are a number of churches in the town, including Anglican, Uniting, Church of Christ and Lutheran Churches.
There are also a large number of sporting groups in the town, including football, cricket, netball, basketball, tennis, bowls and golf clubs, with most of the clubs competing in local leagues.

The Tumby Bay Area School provides education for students from Reception through to Year 12. A public library is located on the school grounds. A hospital is also in place to serve the health needs of the town.

The region's history is celebrated by a National Trust Museum which is staffed by volunteers.

Social historian and Tumby Bay resident Eric Kotz has also published two books about life in the region.

Media
The town was briefly the home to a newspaper, the Western People and Tumby Bay Times (19 June – 3 July 1912), which was printed locally by Walter Augustine Wade.

Government
Tumby Bay is encompassed in the District Council of Tumby Bay local government area with the current mayor being Sam Telfer. The town is also incorporated in the South Australian House of Assembly electoral district of Flinders and the Australian House of Representatives Division of Grey.

Transport 
Tumby Bay is normally reached by private car via the Lincoln Highway that runs along the east coastline of the Eyre Peninsula. Although the town does have a sealed airfield, it is not usually used for private flights, but for the Flying Doctor and crop spraying aircraft.

The town is serviced daily by Stateliner coaches.

Port and Rail 
The site has been referred to as Sheep Hill, and the project now bears the name of Port Spencer. Centrex Metals is the project proponent. The site is located immediately north of Lipson Cove. The proposed port (if approved) will be capable of loading Capesize ships (either directly or by transshipment) for export of iron ore and potentially, grain. The port will be completed by 2023.

References

External links 
 Tourism Site
 Council Site
 Street-Directory.com Map
 SD Map

Coastal towns in South Australia
Eyre Peninsula
Bays of South Australia
Spencer Gulf